Ki Kore Bolbo Tomay is an Indian Bengali television romantic family drama serial broadcast on the TV channel Zee Bangla and its digital platform ZEE5. It premiered on 16 December 2019. Swastika Dutta and Krushal Ahuja played the lead roles. The series was produced by Shashi Mittal and Sumeet Hukumchand Mittal under the banner of Shashi Sumeet Productions. The story mainly revolves around Radhika and Karna's life.

Plot
Radhika is a kind-hearted woman. She is a fashion designer, where she wants to be in life, and focused on her goals. One day, she is engaged to Koushik, who she is smitten with. All seemed well until the day before their wedding, when Koushik goes missing. This takes everyone by shock, and Radhika's world comes crashing down. Amidst the heartbreak and sorrow, Radhika resolves to move on and takes up a job with a clothing line, where she meets Karna, the head of the company. He is broken-hearted and a businessman. He soon falls for Radhika, who is unrelenting, bearing in mind her responsibilities and obligations. Radhika finds her way in the maze of relationship and ethics. After facing several hurdles, Radhika and Karna finally get married. Earlier, Karna tried to protect Radhika from getting humiliated in front of others. He puts sindoor on her forehead. Initially, the family members don't accept the relationship. Finally the couple gets hitched following all the rituals, but soon Karana's ex, Janhavi comes into his life and tries to claim him back. Karna refuses and tells her he will never return in his life since they both are married now, and he loves Radhika. She then frames him for molesting her, but Radhika fights his case and proves him innocent. This proves Janhavi is guilty and gets sentenced for 1 year in prison. After this incident, her husband, Mr. Dutta divorces her. Soon after, Karna and Radhika start facing relationship problems as Karna gets busy with his work. Later, due to a misunderstanding, Karna slaps Radhika and Payel uses this opportunity to create a rift between them. Radhika leaves Karna and goes to Darjeeling.

5 years later
Radhika settles in Darjeeling and has adopted a child, Abhi. She is a part of Christian school where she loves all the students and looks after them. Karna came to Darjeeling and he and Sohini decided to appoint a fashion designer for their company. They appointed Radhika, who is not aware she is being appointed for Sen Creations and Karna. Sohini also doesn't know they appointed Radhika. Karna went to the same place where he met Radhika for the first time, and coincidentally, Radhika also went there. Abhi challenged Karna to play kanamachi with him. Karna tied a handkerchief on his eyes and started finding Abhi. Karna unknowingly goes to the cliff, and as he was going to fall, Radhika saved him. Both were shocked to see each other. On the other hand, Payel was doing things according to her wish. Anuradha arranged a Puja and Payel intentionally arranged a kitty party in Sen House and asked Anuradha to postpone the Puja and Karna. Radhika starts to have again a close bond for Rini and Shuvam's marriage arrangements... A new villain, Kali: Abhi's father, a criminal and a psychopath in Radhika and Karna's life to trouble them. Karna and his parents disguised as chefs and servant to expose Kali. After, Rini's mother, Jayati apologizes to Shuvam and his family for misbehaving. Soon after, Radhika declares she is pregnant and everyone in Sen's family enjoys the coming of Radhika's child. The Sen family arranges Kali Puja at their house for Radhika's child, and Radhika prays to Goddess Kali to tell her the way so they can expose the villain Kali. After, Sonali Kakima comes to Sen's house, apologizes for all her misdeeds, and helps Radhika and the Sen's to expose Kali's evil intentions. Radhika soon exposes Kali and punishes him. Radhika got injured due to the bomb fitted by Kali and immediately taken to the hospital. Everyone in Sen's family prays for Radhika and her child's well-being. Argha scolds Payel for joining hands with Kali and making Radihka-Karna's life in danger. Also, she tells her if something happens to Radhika or her child he would not spare her. Radhika comes from the hospital to Sen's house, and seeing everyone sad, she questioned what has happened. Anuradha informed her out of Radhika and are child, anyone can be saved. On hearing the news, Radhika broke down. To make Radhika happy, Abhi comes back to Sen's house and enjoys with them all. Payel becomes good. Accidentally, Abhi's hand touches Radhika's womb, and she falls into unconsciousness. The doctor was immediately called and said Radhika's baby is now safe. Later, Radhika told Karna she wished to have some delicious foods and Karna in a second order foods. Payel then quarrels about the property divisions with the Sen's. Later, Radhika gives birth to a baby girl and everyone is happy. The series ended with the romantic dance of Radhika and Karna on the title song of the serial Ki Kore Bolbo Tomay.

Cast
 Swastika Dutta as Radhika Sen (née Mitra): Karna's wife CEO of Sen creations, Karna's wife
 Krushal Ahuja as Karna Sen: CEO of Sen creations, Jahnavi's ex-boyfriend and Radhika's husband

Recurring
 Aditi Chatterjee as Anuradha Sen aka Anu : Karna and Babli's mother, Joy and Radhika's Mother-in-law, Adinath's wife.
 Sohon Bandhopadhyay as Adinath Sen aka Adi: Karna and Babli's father, Joy and Radhika's Father- in-law, Anuradha's husband.
 Sayantani Sengupta as Jayati Sen: Karna's aunt and Radhika's aunt (Chotokaki), Anuradha's sister and Basudeb's Wife, Rini's mother.
 Shyamashis Pahari as Basudeb Sen: Karna's and Radhika's uncle (Chotokaka), Adinath's Brother- Jayati's Husband :Rini's father. 
 Manosi Sengupta as Payel Sen: Arghya's Wife, Trisha's elder sister.
 Ananya Sengupta as Nirmala Basu aka Moni: Radhika's adoptive mother, Joy's aunt, Karna's mother in law.
 Arpita Mukherjee as Sonali Basu: Soumi's and Joy's mother- Arup's wife, Kaushik's aunt, Radhika's aunt.
 Aarush Dey as Abhi Sen: Radhika's adopted child, Kali's real child.
 Uday Pratap Singh as Joy Basu: Babli's fake husband but after jailed turned into real husband- a terrorist.
 Olivia Malakar as Rini Sen: Subham's wife- Jayati and Basudeb's daughter, Karna's cousin sister.
 Shritama Mitra as Soumi Basu: Sonali and Arup daughter, Joy's sister, Kaushik's cousin sister.
 Arghya Mukherjee as Arup Basu: Sonali's husband, Joy and Soumi's father, Kaushik uncle.
 Sohini Banerjee / Kuyasha Biswas as Babli Basu (née Sen): Joy's wife and love interest, Anuradha and Adinath's adoptive daughter, Karna's Sister.
 Rahul Dev Bose as Koushik Basu: Moni's son, Radhika's former fiance, Riya's love interest.
 Royshreema Das as Riya: Koushik's lover.
 Tanushree Bhattacharya Bose as Sohini Mukherjee: Karna's Personal assistant.
 Somashri Bhattacharya as Trisha: Payel's sister, Karna's love interest.
 Sanghasri Sinha Mitra as Dolly Sen (née Singh): Payel's mother-in-law, Arghya's mother, Karna's aunt.
 Moyna Mukherjee as Pinky: Moni's close friend. She knew from the first time Radhika and Karna are meant to be.
 Indrajit Mazumder as Partho: Moni's caretaker and close friend.
 Jasmine Roy as Jahnavi Dutta: Karna's former lover, Mr Dutta's wife.
 Subhajit Banerjee as Mr. Dutta: Jahnavi's husband.
 Purbasha Debnath as Ishani: A designer in Sen Creation she loves Karna- Works under Radhika.
 Fahim Mirza as Dr. Dev: Abhi's doctor. 
 Saugata Bandyopadhyay as Kali: Abhi's biological father a terrorist.

Production

Development
The series was producing by Shashi Mittal's Shashi Sumeet Productions company. It is the second Bengali series from the production house.

Filming
For the first promo of the series, the cast and crews traveled different parts of Darjeeling and Nepal to shoot the sequences. While Swastika said, "We wanted to show the steam engine in the promo. There was a train early in the morning at Ghum railway station. We had to wake up and start our journey almost at 3 am so that we don't miss the train". Also the team went to Tumling, Nepal, to shoot some sequences for the initial episoded. But the series is mainly filmed at sets in Kolkata.

Adaptations

References

External links
Ki Kore Bolbo Tomay on ZEE5
 

Bengali-language television programming in India
Zee Bangla original programming
2019 Indian television series debuts
2021 Indian television series endings
Indian drama television series
Indian comedy television series